The Théâtre du Jorat, inaugurated 9 May 1908, is a theater hall located in the Vaud commune of Mézières, Switzerland, about 20 km from Lausanne, in the Jorat region.

Description 
The Théâtre du Jorat was established by René Morax in 1908. Constructed entirely of wood which ensures its integration with neighboring farms, it is nicknamed the "Sublime barn" or the "Wooden palace" by the inhabitants of the commune. The building is listed in the  Swiss Inventory of Cultural Property of National and Regional Significance.

The venue offers more than 1000 seats. In particular, it was the place where Le Roi David by Arthur Honegger and many works by Gustave Doret were premiered.

Hugues Cuénod made his last stage appearance at the theatre in 1994, performing as M Triquet in Eugene Onegin.

References

External links 

 
 Théâtre du Jorat on Commune de Jorat-Mézières
 Mézières – Théâtre du Jorat by Patrick Crispini
 Virtual tour of the Théâtre du Jorat, Google Maps

Jorat
Buildings and structures in the canton of Vaud
Cultural property of national significance in the canton of Vaud
Music venues in Switzerland
1908 establishments in Switzerland
Theatres completed in 1908
Music venues completed in 1908
20th-century architecture in Switzerland